Georg Weig, SVD (Chinese name: Wei Changlu) (14 December 1883 – 3 October 1941) was a German prelate of the Roman Catholic Church. He served as Prefect of the Apostolic Prefecture of Qingdao (18 March 1925—20 June 1928) and Vicar Apostolic of the Apostolic Vicariate of Qingdao. Bishop Weig's Chinese name was Wei Changlu.

 St. Michael's Cathedral was built and consecrated during Bishop Weig's reign, and he is entombed there. The inscription over his tomb is written in Latin and Chinese, and reads:

His tomb is damaged, having been defaced during the Cultural Revolution, and this is evident from the photo.

References

1893 births
1941 deaths
Divine Word Missionaries Order
20th-century Roman Catholic bishops in China
20th-century German Roman Catholic bishops
20th-century German Roman Catholic priests